Siemens is a German engineering and technology conglomerate founded by Werner von Siemens.

Siemens may also refer to:

People 
Siemens (surname), list of people with the German surname
Siemens family, a family of German inventors, engineers, and industrialists, including:
Werner von Siemens (1816–1892), German inventor and founder of Siemens AG
Carl Wilhelm Siemens (1823–1883), brother of Werner von Siemens and inventor of the Open Hearth Furnace

Places 
Siemens, Michigan, a community in the United States

Companies 
 Siemens AG, a German multinational corporation founded by the Siemens family. Subsidiaries named Siemens include:
Siemens Building Technologies
Siemens Digital Industries Software
Siemens Energy Sector
Siemens Financial Services
Siemens Healthineers
Siemens Mobility
Siemens Nixdorf Informationssysteme
Siemens Power Generation
Siemens Wind Power
Siemens Technology and Services, Indian subsidiary in Mumbai
 Siemens & Halske (1847–1966), German electrical engineering company that later became Siemens AG
Siemens Brothers (1858–1955), British engineering branch of the company, later sold during World War I
 Siemens-Schuckert (1803–1966), German electrical engineering company incorporated into Siemens AG in 1966
 Siemens Transportation Group, unrelated Canadian transportation company

Science and technology 
 Siemens Nexas, a type of metro train that operates in Melbourne, Australia
 siemens (unit), symbol S, the SI derived unit of electrical conductance
 Siemens-Martin process, open hearth furnace process invented by Carl Siemens
 Siemens mercury unit, an obsolete unit of electrical resistance

See also
List of assets owned by Siemens
List of Siemens products